Air Chief Marshal Imam Sufaat (Wates, Yogyakarta, January 27, 1955) was the Chief of Staff of the Indonesian Air Force from 2009 to 2012.

Sufaat is a Javanese Muslim from Yogyakarta in Java, Indonesia.

|-

References

Indonesian Air Force air marshals
1955 births
Living people
Chiefs of Staff of the Indonesian Air Force
Javanese people
Indonesian Muslims
People from Yogyakarta